Edson Luis Zwaricz (born 4 July 1971) is a Brazilian former footballer who played for clubs in Brazil and Mexico.

Career
Born in União da Vitória, Zwaricz began playing professional football as a striker with Esporte Clube Pinheiros (PR) at age 17. He also played for local sides Paraná Clube and Platinense-PR. In 1993, he moved to Mexico to play for Tecos de la UAG, where he won the 1993–94 Mexican Primera División title. He continued to play in the lower divisions of Mexican football, except for brief stints back in the Primera with C.F. Monterrey and Dorados de Sinaloa, scoring more than 200 goals in his Mexican playing career.

By 2003, Zwaricz was a naturalized Mexican citizen, and was captain of Primera A División side Alacranes de Durango. In June 2008, he joined Socio Águila, America's Primera A affiliate.

Honours
UAG Tecos
Mexico Primera Division: 1993–94

References

External links
 
 
 Edson Luis Zwaricz at BDFA.com.ar 

1971 births
Living people
People from Paraná (state)
Brazilian emigrants to Mexico
Mexican footballers
Naturalized citizens of Mexico
Paraná Clube players
Tecos F.C. footballers
C.F. Monterrey players
Dorados de Sinaloa footballers
Lobos BUAP footballers
C.F. Mérida footballers
Liga MX players
Association football forwards